Ossona is a comune (municipality) in the Metropolitan City of Milan in the Italian region Lombardy, located about  west of Milan.

The municipality of Ossona contains the frazione (subdivision) Asmonte.

Ossona borders the following municipalities: Casorezzo, Inveruno, Arluno, Mesero, Marcallo con Casone, Santo Stefano Ticino.

Demographic evolution

References

External links
 www.comunediossona.it/

Cities and towns in Lombardy